Samuel Seymour may refer to:

 Samuel Seymour (artist) (ca. 1775–ca. 1832) was a painter, engraver, and illustrator of Long's Expedition of 1820 and 1823
 Samuel J. Seymour (1860–1956), last surviving person who had been present in Ford's Theater the night of the assassination of Abraham Lincoln
 Samuel W. Seymour, American lawyer